Merho, born Robert Merhottein on 24 October 1948, is a Belgian comic-book writer and artist, best known for creating the comic strip De Kiekeboes.

Early life
Robert Merhottein was born in Antwerp, Belgium in 1948. As a child, he already loved the comics by Marc Sleen and Willy Vandersteen, and wanted to become a comics artist when he grew up. He studied at the Sint-Lukas Art School in Brussels in the 1960s.

Career
Merho's first two comics, Comi en Dakske and Zoz and Zef, were made when he is only a teenager. Afterwards, he worked for five years as an assistant on Jerom and Pats with Studio Vandersteen, but then started his own series, Kiekeboe, in the newspaper Het Laatste Nieuws. Contrary to the other major Flemish newspapers like De Standaard/Het Nieuwsblad (with Spike and Suzy) and Het Volk (with Nero), Het Laatste Nieuws had no local, Flemish comic strip but only published Dutch comics by Marten Toonder or Hans G. Kresse, which left an opportunity for Merho.

Kiekeboe is a typical Flemish comic, about a normal family which unwillingly gets into all kinds of adventures. Filled with humour (mostly puns and misunderstandings), adventure, movie references, and some slight eroticism with the promiscuous teenage daughter Fanny, the comic became an instant success. The first story was serialized in the newspaper starting on 15 February 1977 and continues almost uninterrupted, although the comic has switched from Het Laatste Nieuws to Gazet van Antwerpen.

With more than 100 albums, the Kiekeboe series is one of the three most successful Flemish comics and sells over 100,000 copies with each new album and 1 million albums per year in total. The series does not have any success abroad, with only a short-lived French, German and English translation, and an unsuccessful rebranding for the Dutch market.

Bibliography

Awards and honours
1983: Bronzen Adhemar, Turnhout, Belgium
1991: Award for Best Flemish Comic of the Flemish chamber of Comics Experts
2000: Stamp with Kiekeboe issued by the Belgian Post
2002: Honorary citizen of Zoersel, Belgium

Notes

Sources
 Matla, Hans: "Stripkatalogus 9: De negende dimensie". Panda, Den Haag, 1998.

External links

Merho biography on Lambiek Comiclopedia
Official site (in Dutch)

1948 births
Living people
Belgian comics artists
Belgian comics writers
Belgian humorists
People from Zoersel